Kim Do-hyung (born 6 October 1990) is a South Korean footballer who plays as a forward for Busan I'Park FC.

Career statistics

Club

Notes

References

External links
 

1990 births
Living people
Sportspeople from Ulsan
Dong-a University alumni
South Korean footballers
Association football forwards
K League 1 players
China League One players
K League 2 players
K3 League players
Ulsan Hyundai FC players
Busan IPark players
Yanbian Funde F.C. players
Chungju Hummel FC players
Gimcheon Sangmu FC players
Pohang Steelers players
Daejeon Korail FC players
Suwon FC players
Hwaseong FC players
South Korean expatriate footballers
South Korean expatriate sportspeople in China
Expatriate footballers in China